The Central Committee of the 4th Congress of the Russian Social Democratic Labour Party was in session from 1906 until 1907.

Plenums
The Central Committee was not a permanent institution. It convened plenary sessions and meetings. Two meetings were held between the 1st Conference and the 5th Congress. When the CC was not in session, decision-making power was vested in the internal bodies of the CC itself; that is, the Politburo, Secretariat and Orgburo. None of these bodies were permanent either; typically they convened several times a month.

Composition

References

Citations

Bibliography
 

Central Committee elected by the 04
1906 establishments in the Russian Empire
1907 disestablishments in the Russian Empire